Non-Stop Erotic Cabaret is the debut studio album by English synth-pop duo Soft Cell, released on 27 November 1981 by Some Bizzare Records. The album's critical and commercial success was bolstered by the success of its lead single, a cover version of Gloria Jones's song "Tainted Love", which topped the charts worldwide and became the best-selling British single of 1981. In the United States—as a result of the single's success, the album had reported advance orders of more than 200,000 copies. The album spawned two additional top-five singles in the UK: "Bedsitter" and "Say Hello, Wave Goodbye".

Recording
The album was created on a limited budget; it was supposedly recorded almost entirely with a ReVox tape recorder, a borrowed Roland drum machine belonging to Kit Hain, a Korg SB-100 Synthe Bass, and an NED Synclavier, belonging to producer Mike Thorne. David Ball noted the Synclavier would ordinarily have been well beyond the band's means, costing £120,000: "That was our technological advantage over the other synth bands at the time. In fact, I remember Don Was calling me – desperate to know how we got those sounds." The group caused some controversy in the United Kingdom over the song "Sex Dwarf", the music video of which was banned due to its explicit, S&M-related content.

Reception

Reviews for the album were mixed. Melody Maker said, "Non-Stop Erotic Cabaret... confronts clubland with its patchy past, rubs perspective in its pretty painted face and acts like it means nothing... Aggressively embarrassing, Cabaret is the brashest, most brilliant and least-caring indictment of pop music's bankruptcy I've ever heard. No compassion, no sorrow, no joy, it just faces facts and moves to the motions... Like traditional cabaret, the whole thing parodies true emotion and like the best subversive cabaret its shallowness makes those devalued emotions even more painful – the very real decadence of this album springs from its callous realisation of pop's impotency, and yet its bored resignation to the ritual." However, NME found the album's premise was hollow, complaining that "the Soft Cell sex strategy should offer something spicy, rude and even a little wonderful... but Soft Cell are conceptualists who rely on too many preconceptions and play around with too many ideas to convince you of any personal energy or commitment... Soft Cell are very plain fare – unspectacular music and very drab and flat lyrics, wrapped in a hint of special promise which is never realised."

Accolades
CMJ New Music Report included Non-Stop Erotic Cabaret on a list of The Top 25 College Radio Albums of All Time. American magazine Out placed the album at number 66 on their list of The 100 Greatest, Gayest Albums (of All Time). It was also included in Robert Dimery's book 1001 Albums You Must Hear Before You Die.

Track listing

Personnel
Credits adapted from the liner notes of Non-Stop Erotic Cabaret.

Soft Cell
 Marc Almond – vocals
 David Ball – electronic and acoustic instruments

Additional musicians
 Vicious Pink Phenomena – backing vocals
 David Tofani – saxophone ; clarinet

Technical
 Mike Thorne – production
 Don Wershba – engineering 
 Paul Hardiman – engineering 
 Harvey Goldberg – mixing
 Nicky Kalliongis – engineering assistance
 Andy Hoggman – engineering assistance
 Michael Christopher – engineering assistance
 Jack Skinner – mastering
 Arun Chakraverti – mastering
 Daniel Miller – production (1996 reissue)
 David Ball – production (1996 reissue)

Artwork
 Peter Ashworth – photography
 Huw Feather – padded cell
 Andrew Prewett – design
 Richard Smith – liner notes (1996 reissue)

Charts

Weekly charts

Year-end charts

Certifications

Notes

References

1981 debut albums
Albums produced by Mike Thorne
Mercury Records albums
Sire Records albums
Soft Cell albums
Some Bizzare Records albums
Vertigo Records albums